Hiding in Plain Sight may refer to:
 Hiding in Plain Sight (Kendzior book), a 2020 nonfiction book by Sarah Kendzior
 Hiding in Plain Sight (novel), a 2014 novel by Nuruddin Farah
 "Hiding in Plain Sight", a song by Jessica Molaskey on the 2008 album A Kiss to Build a Dream On

See also
 Hidden in Plain Sight, a 2010 nonfiction book by Juha Suoranta
 In Plain Sight (disambiguation)